Staphylococcus arlettae is a gram-positive, coagulase-negative member of the bacterial genus Staphylococcus consisting of clustered cocci.  It has been isolated from the skin of mammals and birds and is novobiocin resistant. A strain of this species isolated from effluent from a textile factory was found to be able to degrade azo dyes.

Some strains of S. arlettae are highly salt tolerant and commonly found in marine environment. S.I. Paul et al. (2021) isolated and identified salt tolerant strains of S. arlettae (strains ISP142A, ISP172C and ISP192A) from Cliona viridis sponges of the Saint Martin's Island Area of the Bay of Bengal, Bangladesh.

Biochemical characteristics of S. arlettae 
Colony, morphological, physiological, and biochemical characteristics of marine S. arlettae are shown in the Table below.

Note: + = Positive, – =Negative

References

External links
Type strain of Staphylococcus arlettae at BacDive -  the Bacterial Diversity Metadatabase

arlettae
Bacteria described in 1985